Amplier is a commune in the Pas-de-Calais department in northern France.

Geography
A farming village located in the Authie valley (the border with the Somme department), 20 miles (32 km) southwest of Arras, on the D24 road.

Population

Sights
 The church of St. Hilaire, dating from the eighteenth century.

See also
Communes of the Pas-de-Calais department

References

Communes of Pas-de-Calais